Frederic Henry Gravely (7 December 1885 – 1965) was an eminent British arachnologist, entomologist, botanist, zoologist and student of archaeology, who conducted pioneering research and wrote extensively on various subjects during his tenure at the Indian Museum, Calcutta, and the Government Museum, Madras.

Early life

Gravely was born in 1885 in Wellingborough, Northamptonshire, England to Arthur Frederic Gravely and Margaret Hutchinson, the eldest of four children. The family were Quakers and although the father was a businessman, he was interested in natural history. His mother came from a farming family which also produced Sir Jonathan Hutchinson. At the age of nine he moved to a boarding school in Sheffield. He then studied at Ackworth and Bootham (both Quaker schools) before moving to Manchester University to study zoology.

Indian Museum, Calcutta
Gravely graduated in 1906 and became a demonstrator at Manchester in 1907. He worked on collections made in the "Discovery" Antarctic Expedition along with S.J. Hickson and worked on Polychaete Larvae. In 1909 he was appointed Assistant Superintendent of the Indian Museum Calcutta. In 1914, still at Calcutta, he received his D.Sc. for the work on the Oriental Passalidae. He unified the monographs of early observers with the notes of Arrow and Zang to bring to the oriental passalids (1914), and the family itself in general (1918), the classification that is in vogue today with minor alterations.

Government Museum, Madras
Dr. Gravely became the Superintendent of the Government Museum of Madras in 1920. Over the next two decades, he undertook the investigation of the littoral fauna of Krusadai Island, Gulf of Mannar, revived the Bulletin of the museum, and embarked on the scientific preservation, study and interpretation of the museum's collections. His work on Arachnida and Mollusca significantly enhanced the collections of the museum in the two zoological groups. He was also responsible for enlarging the reserve collection, particularly of Invertebrates.

Dr. Gravely contributed to the overall development of the museum as well. He, along with the Curator Dr. C. Sivaramamurti, ensured in 1938 that the antiquities and industrial art collected by the museum was organized effectively, into a collection that exists even today. The most important of Dr. Gravely's many contributions to the subject was the monograph he collaborated on with T. N. Ramachandran (Curator of Archaeology 1925–1935) on the scientific basis for identifying the period of metal images. Dr. Gravely also donated a variety of sculptures, carvings and bronzes to other institutions, including the Prince of Wales Museum, the Lucknow Museum and Dr. Ananda Coomaraswami's Museum in Boston. Dr. Gravely, and P V Mayuranathan considerably enhanced the Herbarium and the botanical collections of the museum.

Dr. Gravely pioneered the preservation of bronzes collected by the museum. He initiated the electrolytic restoration process which has helped preserve not only bronze objects, but also ethnological, pre-historic and numismatic collections. He also built a separate Chemical Conservation Laboratory, the only one of its kind at the time, in 1937.

Other contributions
He was one of the Foundation Fellows of the National Institute of Sciences of India, now the apex scientific body in the country, Indian National Science Academy. He also served as the Secretary to the Asiatic Society in the period 1915–18.
His insect and spider collection is in the Indian Museum, Calcutta. It notably contain insects, Arachnida and Myriapoda from limestone caves in Burma (1911), and oriental Passalidae.

Personal life
In 1925 he married Laura Balling and they had a daughter Ann Margaret (born 1928) and a son John Frederic (born 1931). He supported the Toc H of which the first Indian branch was set up in the "Museum House".

Bibliography
Hydroid Zoophytes (F. H. Gravely and S. J. Hickson), Natural History Journal, 1907
Hydrozoa, Proceedings and Transactions of the Liverpool Biological Society Vol XXII, 1908
Notes on the habits and distribution of Limnocnida indica (F. H. Gravely and S. P. Agharkar), 1912
Three genera of Papuan passalid Coleoptera, Journal of the Zoological Museum Hamburg, XXX, 1913
Limestone caves of Burma and the Malay Peninsula (F. H. Gravely, N. Annandale and B. J. Coggin), Proceedings of the Asiatic Society of Bengal IX, 1913
Account of the oriental Passalidae (Coleoptera), Memoirs of the Indian Museum, III, 1914
Notes on the habits of Indian insects, myriapods and arachnids, Records of the Indian Museum Calcutta II, 1915
Notes on Indian mygalomorph Spiders, Records of the Indian Museum Calcutta II, 1915
Contribution to the revision of the Passalidae of the World, Memoirs of the Indian Museum VII, 1918
A note on the marine invertebrate fauna of Chandipore, Orissa, 1919
The spiders and scorpions of Barkuda Island, Records of the Indian Museum XXII, 1921
Some Indian spiders of the subfamily Tetragnathinae, Records of the Indian Museum XXII, 1921
Common Indian spiders, Journal of the Bombay Natural History Society XXVIII, 1922
Some Indian spiders of the family Lycosidae, Records of the Indian Museum XXVI, 1924
The Arachnida and Insecta sections (The littoral fauna of Krusadai Island), Bulletin of Madras Government Museum, 1927
Section on Orders Gymnoblastea and Calyptoblastea (The littoral fauna of Krusadai Island), Bulletin of Madras Government Museum, 1927
The Indian Species of the Genus Caralluma, Family : Asclepiadaceae, (F. H. Gravely and P. V. Mayuranathan), 1931
Some Indian spiders of the families Ctenidae, Sparassidae, Selenopidae and Clubionidae, Records of the Indian Museum XXXIII, 1931
Catalogue of Hindu Metal Images in the Government Museum, Madras (F. H. Gravely and T. N. Ramachandran), 1932
The Three Main Styles of Temple Architecture Recognised by Silpa Sastras (F. H. Gravely and T. N. Ramachandran), 1934
An Outline of Indian Temple Architecture, 1936
An Introduction to South Indian Temple Architecture and Sculptures (F. H. Gravely and C. Sivaramamurti), 1939
Illustrations of Indian Sculptures Mostly Southern (F. H. Gravely and C. Sivaramamurti), 1939
Shells and Other Animal Remains Found on the Madras Beach, Vol I, 1941
Shells and Other Animal Remains Found on the Madras Beach, Vol II, 1942
Guide to the Archaeological Galleries (F. H. Gravely and C. Sivaramamurti), 1947
The Gopuras of Thiruvannamalai, 1959
Notes on Hindu Images (F. H. Gravely and C. Sivaramamurti), 1977

References

Krishnan, R. and Balaram, P. 2007. "Current Science: Some early  history." Current Science 92(1):129-138 PDF

External links
Chennai Museum
Genera named by F H Gravely
 Presidents of the Asiatic Society
 A contribution towards the revision of the Passalidae of the world (1918)
 An account of the Oriental Passalidae (Coleoptera) : based primarily on the collection in the Indian Museum (1914)

Indian botanical writers
Alumni of the Victoria University of Manchester
English entomologists
1885 births
1965 deaths
People from Wellingborough
English botanical writers
20th-century British zoologists